Nicolasa is a feminine given name. People with the name include:

 María Nicolasa de Iturbide (1774-1840), Princess of Iturbide
 Nicolasa Dayrit Panlilio (1874-1945), Filipina non-combatant in the Philippine–American War
 Nicolasa Escamilla (known as "La Pajuelera"; fl. 1747 – fl. 1776), Spanish bullfighter
 Nicolasa Machaca (born 1952), Bolivian union leader and health care worker
 Nicolasa Pradera (1870–1959), Basque chef, restaurateur, cookbook author
 Nicolasa Quintremán (1939-2013), Chilean Pehuenche activist
 Nicolasa Valdés (1733-1810), First Lady of Chile

Feminine given names